All the Brothers Were Valiant is a story by Ben Ames Williams. It was published in the 1919 April and May issues of Everybody's Magazine with illustrations by N. C. Wyeth; a hardcover edition followed in May with jacket art, front and rear, also by Wyeth. It was Williams's first published novel, although he had previously written many short stories for magazines. It has been adapted to film three times, all by MGM: All the Brothers Were Valiant (1923, now lost), Across to Singapore (1928) and All the Brothers Were Valiant (1953). Polar explorer Richard E. Byrd carried a copy on his 1933-1935 solo journey to Antarctica; he wrote in his journal that he was challenged reading it due to eye problems caused by carbon monoxide poisoning from his stove.

Editions

 Subsequent re-impressions include Grosset & Dunlap (New York, 1919), E.P. Dutton (New York, 1919) and the first U.K edition by Mills & Boon (London, 1920).

References

External links
  (plain text)
All the Brothers Were Valiant at Internet Archive (scanned books various formats)
 

1919 American novels
American novels adapted into films
1919 debut novels
Macmillan Publishers books
Mills & Boon books